The Itapecuru River is a river in the Maranhão state of northern Brazil.

Course

It is an important source of water for twenty cities in Maranhão, including São Luís.
Some of the headwaters of the river are protected by the  Mirador State Park, created in 1980.

References

Rivers of Maranhão